The name Xangsane has been used to name two tropical cyclones in the northwestern Pacific Ocean. The name was contributed by Laos and is a Laotian word for elephant.
 Typhoon Xangsane (2000) (T0020, 30W, Reming) – affected the Philippines and Taiwan; Singapore Airlines Flight 006 crashed during this storm
 Typhoon Xangsane (2006) (T0615, 18W, Milenyo) – lashed through the Philippines as a Category 4 typhoon.

Xangsane was retired by the ESCAP/WMO Typhoon Committee following the 2006 typhoon season, and was replaced with Leepi for the 2013 season.

Pacific typhoon set index articles